Călin Georgescu (born 1962) is a Romanian senior expert in sustainable development, with an acknowledged recognition in the field, following 17 years of service in the environmental area in the United Nations system. Georgescu was appointed the executive director of the United Nations Global Sustainable Index Institute in Geneva and Vaduz for the period 2015–2016. Prior to that, he served as President of the European Research Centre for the Club of Rome (2013–2015). He is also member of the Club of Rome International in Switzerland.

Education
Georgescu was born in the Cotroceni neighborhood of Bucharest, the son of Scarlat Georgescu and Aneta Georgescu, née Popescu. He is a graduate of the Land Reclamation College, Nicolae Bălcescu Institute of Agronomy in Bucharest (1986) and obtained his Ph.D. in soil science in 1999.

Career
Georgescu acted as the executive director of the National Centre for Sustainable Development in Bucharest from 2000 to 2013. An acknowledged authority in strategic planning and public policies design, he was appointed by the Romanian Government to coordinate the development of two consecutive versions of the National Sustainable Development Strategy (in 1999 and 2008), in line with the guidelines of the European Strategy for Sustainable Development.

He combines comprehensive knowledge of the principles and practice of sustainable development with hands-on field experience by working with stakeholders in the public and private sectors as well as with the civil society in order to design, implement and follow through to completion specific projects under Local Agenda 21 (initiated by United Nations Development Programme in 1992) for more than 40 Romanian municipalities.

A former Senior Fellow with the United Nations Development Programme, Georgescu also held various positions in the UN system, such as UN Special Rapporteur on the adverse effects of the illicit movement and dumping of toxic and dangerous products and waste on the enjoyment of human rights and Representative of the UNEP National Committee for Romania.

He also held such positions as: Adviser to the Minister of Environment, Secretary General of the Ministry of Environment, Director of the International Economic Organisations Department in the Romanian Ministry of Foreign Affairs, Secretary General of the Romanian Association for the Club of Rome and executive director of the Institute for Innovation and Development Projects.

According to a statement given in November 2020, Georgescu stated that Ion Antonescu and Corneliu Zelea Codreanu are heroes through whom "he lived the national history, through them speaks and spoke the national history and not through the lackeys of the globalist powers that lead Romania today temporarily".

Georgescu was proposed as prime minister by the Alliance for the Union of Romanians (AUR), a party that just entered the Romanian Parliament following the December 2020 Romanian legislative election. During the 2021 Romanian political crisis which resulted in the removal from office of the Cîțu Cabinet, the same party proposed him again.

Several press articles criticized Georgescu for his pro-Russian statements, some even considering him the representative of Russian interests in Romania.

Publications
Romania at Crossroads, Editura Logos, Bucuresti, 2014 and Editura Christiana, 2016 (second revised edition and the country project)
"Pentru un ideal comun" [In Search of Common Purpose], Compania Publishing House, Bucharest, 2012.
“România după criză. Reprofesionalizarea” [Romania after the crisis. Reshaping Professional Worth], coordinators  and Călin Georgescu, Compania Publishing House, Bucharest, 2010.
“Trezirea la realitate” [A Wake-up Call], in România post-criză. Reprofesionalizarea României III [Romania after the Crisis], 3rd IPID Report, Bucharest, 2010, pp. 5–15.
“Reclădirea capitalului uman” [Rebuilding Human Capital], in Șansa României: oamenii. Reprofesionalizarea României II  [A Chance for Romania: Betting on People], 2nd IPID Report, București, 2009, pp. 7–18.
“Romania at the Eve of the Third Millennium”, in Millennium III, special issue on “Which Forces are Driving Europe?, European Conference of the National Associations of the Club of Rome”, Bucharest, 23–24 May 2008, pp. 95–103.
“Reprofesionalizarea României” [Reshaping Professional Worth in Romania], 1st IPID Report, Bucharest, 2008; author and editor.
National Sustainable Development Strategy of Romania 2013-2020-2030, (available in Romanian and English), Government of Romania, Bucharest, 2008; Project Manager.
Planurile Locale de Dezvoltare Durabilă “Agenda Locală 21” [Local Sustainable Development Plans under Local Agenda 21], for 40 local authorities, 2000–2008; Project Manager.
National Sustainable Development Strategy, (available in Romanian and English), United Nations Development Programme, Bucharest, 1999; Project Manager.
Romania 2020, Editura Conspress, București, 1998, Editor.

References

External links

Club of Rome (https://www.clubofrome.org/) 
European Research Centre of the Club of Rome (http://www.clubofrome.eu/) 
United Nations Global Sustainability Index Institute - UNGSII (http://www.ungsii.org/) 
United Nations Human Rights - Office of the High Commissioner - OHCHR (http://www.ohchr.org/EN/Pages/Home.aspx) 
United Nations Development Programme - UNDP (http://www.undp.org/
United Nations Environment Programme - UNEP (http://www.unep.org/)
Centrul Național pentru Dezvoltare Durabilă / National Centre for Sustainable Development (http://www.ncsd.ro)
Strategia Națională pentru Dezvoltarea Durabilă a României / National Sustainable Development Strategy (http://strategia.ncsd.ro/)

Articles and interviews
 – TVR 2 – "Legile Afacerilor" (Business Laws), 5 September 2016 – in Romanian
Călin Georgescu despre naționalism, ortodoxie, lupta politică - 8 June 2016 - in Romanian
Călin Georgescu: "Nu recunosc conducerea acestei țări", 29 March 2015 - in Romanian
Călin Georgescu - interviu la Realitatea TV, 25 September 2014 - in Romanian
"România are nevoie de un stat care își servește cu abnegație cetățenii", 3 March 2014 - in Romanian
”Lideri pricepuți. Decizii cruciale”-in Romanian,”Skilled Leaders for Crucial Decisions” in English,  foreword to Romanian edition of "Bankrupting Nature, Denying our Planetary Boundaries" by Anders Wijkman and Johan Rockström(compania, Bucharest, 2013)-in English.
"Trebuie restabilit echilibrul între raţionalitatea economică şi suportabilitatea socială", interview by Adina Ardeleanu, BURSA,  27 October 2011. - in Romanian
VIDEO Călin Georgescu este invitatul lui Victor Ciutacu la emisiunea "Vorbe Grele" la Antena 3, 26 August 2011.
"Avem ce învăța de la alții, dar problemele noastre tot noi trebuie să le rezolvam", interview with Călin Georgescu for RomaniaPress.ro, 3 August 2011. - in Romanian
"Nişa României: agricultura eco" : Călin Georgescu, director executiv al Centrului Naţional pentru Dezvoltare Durabilă din România ["Romania's Niche: bio agriculture": Călin Georgescu, executive director of the National Centre for Sustainable Development"], interview by Sabina Fati, 5 July 2011.-in Romanian
Soluții pentru o relansare economică imediată: Expertul Călin Georgescu la Dezbaterile Wall-Street.ro [Keys to country's immediate economic revival: expert Călin Georgescu at Wall-Street.ro debates], 4 July 2011.-in Romanian
VIDEO "Pentru omenire, criza actuală nu este o problemă, ci ceea ce urmează după ea" [The Current Crisis is not the Problem for the Humanity, but what will come after it], interview by Rodica Culcer and Lidia Moise, PRIM PLAN, TVR 1, 20 June 2011. Emisunea PRIM PLAN – integrala poate fi vazuta la INREGISTRARILE SAPTAMANII, Luni: 20-06-2011.- in Romanian
"Viitorul va fi al creierului și al minții" The Future Will Belong to the Brain and Mind, interview by Roxana Mazilu, Cadran Politic, April 2011.
VIDEO "Interviu în exclusivitate cu Călin Georgescu, unul dintre liderii europeni ai grupului de la Roma" [Exclusive interview with Calin Georgescu, one of the European leaders of the Club of Rome] interview by Lidia Moise, TVR, 18 March 2011. - in Romanian
Despre soluții pentru o relansare economică imediată a țării [Keys to country's immediate economic revival], interview by Dr. Alex Todericiu, 15 December 2010, Wall Street, INTERVIU - Calin Georgescu: Despre solutii pentru o relansare economica imediata a tarii (in Romanian).
"Poporul român va dainui, criza e provocată de trufie și lacomie" [The people of Romania will endure. Vanity and greed got us into crisis.], interview by Irina Ursu and Lucian Hainăroșie, 16 November 2010, www.ziare.com, Calin Georgescu: Poporul roman va dainui, criza e provocata de trufie si lacomie - Interviu (in Romanian).
"Sunt oameni pregătiţi să-şi dedice viaţa reconstruirii acestei ţări" [We have people who are willing to serve the country] by Anca Hriban and Roland Cătălin Pena, 29 October 2010, Ziua Veche,   (in Romanian).
”Călin Georgescu: România nu este aceasta” [Călin Georgescu: This is not Romania], interview by George Rădulescu, 15 October 2010, Adevărul, Călin Georgescu: „România nu este aceasta” (in Romanian).
VIDEO. "Expertul Călin Georgescu la videochatul Adevărul: În patru ani, România ar putea să devină lider european” [VIDEO The expert Călin Georgescu at Adevărul videochat: In four years Romania might become European leader], 6 October 2010, Adevărul, http://www.adevarul.ro/actualitate/Expertul_in_Dezvoltare_Durabila_Calin_Georgescu_va_fi_prezent_de_la_ora_13-00_la_vidochatul_adevarul-ro_0_348565358.html (in Romanian).
”Măsurile de austeritate sunt luate pe genunchi” [Austerity Measures in a Rush], interview with Călin Georgescu by Stelian Negrea, Financiarul, 15 June 2010, Calin Georgescu: „Masurile de austeritate sunt luate pe genunchi“ | Interviu (in Romanian).
”N-am văzut încă o gândire coerentă pentru repornirea motoarelor economiei” [No Coherent Thinking on Restarting the Economic Engine], interview with Călin Georgescu by Cristian Andrei, Puterea, 13 May 2010,  (in Romanian).
”Mergeți la drum cu profesioniștii!” [Go along with the Professionals], article by Călin Georgescu, Foreign Policy România, September/October 2009; Profesional » Blog Archive » Mergeti la drum cu profesionistii! - Blogul Alianței Profesioniștilor pentru Progres (in Romanian).
”Profesioniştii strâng rândurile pentru România” [The Professionals Close Ranks for Romania], interview with Călin Georgescu, Jurnalul Național, 9 July 2009, “Profesioniştii strâng rândurile pentru România” (in Romanian).
”Reprofesionalizarea României” [Reshaping Romania's Professional Worth], interview with Călin Georgescu by Cristian Banu, Cadran Politic, No 67, 2009,  Cadran politic - Revista lunara de analiza si informare politica (in Romanian).
”Incompetenţa generează corupţia” [Incompetence Breeds Corruption], interview with Călin Georgescu by Ovidiu Nahoi, Adevărul, 9 December 2008, http://www.adevarul.ro/actualitate/eveniment/Incompetenta-genereaza-coruptia_0_25197567.html (in Romanian).

Media reports 

"Romania nu mai este un stat, ci o corporatie condusa de straini", 22 November 2016 - in Romanian
"Motivatia: Romania" , 1 September 2014 - in Romanian
„O soluție pentru ieșirea din criză: dezvoltarea durabilă” [A way out of the crisis: sustainable development], an article by Green Revolution Association, 9 November 2010, CSR Romania. - in Romanian
”România după-criză. Reprofesionalizarea” [Romania after the Crisis. Reshaping Professional Worth], by Dumitru Constantin, 12 October 2010, Cotidianul. -in Romanian
”Reprofesionalizarea României: Călin Georgescu, Dan Puric și Dumitru Costin” [Reshaping Romania's Professional Worth: Călin Georgescu, Dan Puric and Dumitru Costin], by I.Culianu, Wordpress, 23 June 2010, Reprofesionalizarea Romaniei: Calin Georgescu, Dan Puric si Dumitru Costin.
”Desemnarea unui reprezentant al României în funcţia de Raportor special ONU” [Appointment of a Romanian Representative as UN Special Rapporteur], Press release, Ministry of Foreign Affairs, Bucharest, 21 June 2010, http://www.mae.ro/index.php?unde=doc&id=44086&idlnk=2&cat=4.
”Pledoarie pentru competenţă, distributism şi economie civică” [A Plea for Competence, Distributive Growth and Civic Economy] by Ovidiu Hurduzeu, 18 June 2010, http://atreiafortaromaniaprofunda.blogspot.com/2010/06/o-pledoarie-pentru-competenta.html.
”Reprofesionalizarea României - lansarea unui proiect naţional” [Reshaping Romania's Professional Worth: Launch of a National Project], by Roxana Mazilu, Cadran Politic, No 67, 2009 http://arhiva.cadranpolitic.ro/view_article.asp?item=2790&title=?Reprofesionalizarea.
”Anii vacilor slabe” [The Lean Years], by Emil Hurezeanu, Cotidianul, 6 March 2008, https://web.archive.org/web/20110726050731/http://old.cotidianul.ro/anii_vacilor_slabe-79.html.
”Formarea elitelor profesionale—soluția pentru dezvoltarea durabilă a României” [Training of Professional Elites: The Solution for Sustainable Development], EurActiv, 3 March 2008, http://www.euractiv.ro/uniunea-europeana/articles%7CdisplayArticle/articleID_12705/Formarea-elitelor-profesionale-solutia-pentru-dezvoltarea-durabila-a-Romaniei.html.
”L’IPID a lancé le volume La Reprofessionnalisation de la Roumanie”, Investir en Roumanie, 29 February 2008, Investir en Roumanie : L’IPID a lancé le volume "La Reprofessionnalisation de la Roumanie" - actualités économiques et opportunités d'affaires en Roumanie.
”Pentru reprofesionalizarea României e nevoie de proiecte solide” [To Bring Back Professionalism Romania Needs Good Projects], EurActiv, 12 October 2006, http://www.euractiv.ro/uniunea-europeana/articles%7CdisplayArticle/articleID_8382/Pentru-reprofesionalizarea-Romaniei-e-nevoie-de-proiecte-solide.html.

United Nations special rapporteurs
Romanian agronomists
Living people
Romanian officials of the United Nations
Politicians from Bucharest
1962 births
Carol I National Defence University alumni
Alliance for the Union of Romanians politicians